Nafees Lyon (born December 10, 1996) is a professional gridiron football defensive back for the Montreal Alouettes of the Canadian Football League (CFL).

College career 
After using a redshirt season in 2015, Lyon played college football for the Charlotte 49ers from 2016 to 2020, while missing the 2017 season due to injury. He played in 40 games in four seasons where he recorded 137 total tackles, two interceptions, and two forced fumbles.

Professional career

Edmonton Elks 
Lyon signed with the Edmonton Elks on January 11, 2021. He began the 2021 season on the practice roster, but he made his professional debut on October 29, 2021, against the Hamilton Tiger-Cats where he had six defensive tackles. He played and started in the five regular season games where he had 27 defensive tackles and two interceptions. 

In 2022, he played in eight regular season games for the Elks where he had 25 defensive tackles, one sack, one interception, and one forced fumble.

Montreal Alouettes 
On August 31, 2022, Lyon was traded to the Montreal Alouettes along with Thomas Costigan in exchange for Avery Ellis and a third-round pick in the 2023 CFL Draft. In his first game as an Alouette, on September 9, 2022, he scored his first career touchdown on a 52-yard interception return against the BC Lions. He played in six regular season games for the Alouettes where he had 27 defensive tackles, one special teams tackle, one interception, and one touchdown.

Personal life 
Lyon was born to parents Tobin and Belinda Lyon and has one brother, Tobin II.

References

External links 
Montreal Alouettes profile

1996 births
Living people
American football defensive backs
American players of Canadian football
Canadian football defensive backs
Charlotte 49ers football players
Edmonton Elks players
Montreal Alouettes players
Players of American football from Charlotte, North Carolina
Players of Canadian football from North Carolina